The Never Story is the debut album by American rapper JID. It was released on March 10, 2017, by Dreamville Records, Spillage Village and Interscope Records. The Never Story was supported by four official singles; "Never", "D/vision", "Hereditary" and "EdEddnEddy". The album received generally positive reviews from critics and debuted at number 197 on the US Billboard 200. J.I.D's lyrics details a narrative on his upbringing in East Atlanta.

Background
On February 24, the first single "Never" was released. On March 6, the second single, "D/vision" was released, and the tracklist for the album was revealed. The album features guest appearances from EarthGang, 6LACK, and Mereba, with production coming from J. Cole, Hollywood JB, Frank Dukes, Childish Major, Christo, Sean McVerry, Latrell James, OZ the Additive, Tha Officialz, SMKA, and The Imaginary Kids.

Singles and promotion
On February 20, 2017, the same day of announcing the signing to Dreamville, the album's first single "Never" was released. On March 6, after revealing the tracklist, he also released "D/vision" as the second single, with the music video released on August 17. On September 27, the music video for "Hereditary" was released as the third single. On February 7, 2018, the album's fourth single, "EdEddnEddy", accompanied by an animated music video was released. J.I.D also toured the album on his "Never Had Shit" tour with EARTHGANG, Chaz French, and Lute.

Critical reception

The Never Story received very positive reviews. Scott Glausher of HipHopDX said "If there is one hypothesis that J.I.D wants you to walk away with after bumping The Never Story, it's the notion that he can rap well. We all know southern lyricists do in fact exist, but in today's mumble game, it's refreshing to have him remind us with 12 tracks of crafty lyrics and crisp beats." XXL said "J.I.D possesses the lyrical capability and knack for songwriting that could one day put him in a similar space as the 4 Your Eyez Only creator (J. Cole). Announcing his signing with Dreamville in February, the Spillage Village member wasted no time finding his footing, unleashing his The Never Story project just a month later, a collection of songs that validates the hype and makes for a glowing first impression of all that J.I.D has to offer." Reviewing the album for AllMusic, Paul Simpson claimed that "It's obvious that J.I.D isn't trying to emulate anyone else in the Atlanta rap scene. Instead of bass-heavy trap beats, his backing tracks are more organic-sounding and veer closer to smoky neo-soul, as he switches between swift rapping and romantic crooning."

Accolades

Track listing

Notes
  signifies an additional producer.
  signifies an uncredited producer.
 "Never" and "Lauder" are stylized in capital letters.
 "EdEddnEddy" pays tribute to a Cartoon Network show of the same name, by drawing parallels between the show's trio and his adolescent friends.
 "8701" is a reference to fellow Atlanta artist Usher's third studio album, 8701.

Sample credits
 "Doo Wop" contains interpolations of "Every Nigger is a Star", written and performed by Boris Gardiner.
 "EdEddnEddy" contains a sample from "Oblighetto", as performed by Jack McDuff.
 "Hoodbooger" contains elements from "Slightly All The Time", as performed by Soft Machine.
 "Somebody" contains elements from "Time", as performed by Ju-Par Universal Orchestra.
 "All Bad" contains elements from "Parts on Parts" performed by Frank Dukes.

Personnel

Vocalists
 JID - primary artist
 EarthGang - featured artist 
 Mereba - featured artist 
 6LACK - featured artist 

Technical
 Juro "Mez" Davis - mixer

Production
 Childish Major – production 
 Christo – production 
 Hollywood JB – production 
 J. Cole – production 
 Latrell James – production 
 OZ the Additive – production 
 Sean McVerry – production 
 SMKA – production 
 Tha Officialz – production 
 The Imaginary Kids – production 
 Fred Lozano – Art Direction

Charts

References

2017 debut albums
JID albums
Interscope Records albums
Dreamville Records albums
Albums produced by J. Cole